Stefan Giro (born 10 March 1999) is an Australian rules footballer playing for the West Coast Eagles Football Club in the Australian Football League (AFL). He previously played for Fremantle.

Early career

Originally from Hope Valley, a northern suburb of Adelaide, Giro played for Norwood in the South Australian National Football League (SANFL), where he was awarded the MVP for the SANFL Under 18 competition in 2016.  He was selected by Fremantle with their second selection, twenty first overall, in the 2018 AFL rookie draft.

AFL career

Giro made his AFL debut for Fremantle in the round 11 of the 2018 AFL season, alongside fellow debutant Scott Jones. On debut he kicked one goal and had 10 disposals as the Dockers lost to the Magpies by 61 points.

Before the start of the 2019 season, Stefan signed a two year contract extension with Fremantle.  Unfortunately for Stefan, his 2019 season ended prematurely after injuring his ACL in 's round 8 clash against Subiaco. Giro was delisted by Fremantle at the end of the 2021 AFL season.

References

External links

WAFL Player Profile and Statistics 

1999 births
Living people
Fremantle Football Club players
Norwood Football Club players
Peel Thunder Football Club players
Australian rules footballers from South Australia
West Coast Eagles players